The Jens Nielsen House in Ephraim, Utah, is a one-story limestone and adobe pair-house built around 1870. It was listed on the National Register of Historic Places in 1983 and deemed "significant as an example of Scandinavian vernacular architecture in Utah."

Structure
The building is an example of what has been termed a "Type IV pair-house", given it has a tripartite plan (appears to have three equal-sized rooms, each with two bays, and an indented porch in the center section. The outside rooms are stone with a coursed ashlar finish; the center section is adobe, plastered over and marked off on the front to resemble stonework. In 1981, the house remained in a similar condition as when it was built, 110 years before, with the only significant change being a shed roof frame extension to the rear.

The structure was probably built by Jens Christian Nielsen, a Danish-born farmer, around 1870.

References

Pair-houses
Houses on the National Register of Historic Places in Utah
Houses completed in 1870
Sanpete County, Utah